is a current basketball head coach for JX-Eneos Sunflowers in Japan and the former head coach for  Tokoha University.

Head coaching record

|- 
|- style="background:#FDE910;"
| style="text-align:left;"|JX-Eneos Sunflowers
| style="text-align:left;"|2012-2013
| 29||29||0|||| style="text-align:center;"|1st|||6||5||1||
| style="text-align:center;"|Champions
|-
|- style="background:#FDE910;"
| style="text-align:left;"|JX-Eneos Sunflowers
| style="text-align:left;"|2013-2014
| 33||30||3|||| style="text-align:center;"|1st|||5||5||0||
| style="text-align:center;"|Champions
|-
|- style="background:#FDE910;"
| style="text-align:left;"|JX-Eneos Sunflowers
| style="text-align:left;"|2014-2015
| 30||26||4|||| style="text-align:center;"|1st|||5||5||0||
| style="text-align:center;"|Champions
|-
|- style="background:#FDE910;"
| style="text-align:left;"|JX-Eneos Sunflowers
| style="text-align:left;"|2015-2016
| 24||20||4|||| style="text-align:center;"|1st|||6||5||1||
| style="text-align:center;"|Champions
|-

References

1962 births
Living people

Japanese basketball coaches
Japanese women's basketball coaches
Sportspeople from Akita Prefecture